This article contains lists of appearances of the United States men's national water polo team rosters at the Summer Olympics, and is part of the United States men's Olympic water polo team statistics series. The lists are updated as of March 30, 2020.

Abbreviations

Appearances

Players
The following table is pre-sorted by number of Olympic appearances (in descending order), date of the last Olympic appearance (in ascending order), date of the first Olympic appearance (in ascending order), name of the person (in ascending order), respectively.

Sixteen American athletes have each made at least three Olympic appearances. Tony Azevedo is the first and only American water polo player (man or woman) to have competed in five Olympic Games.

Historical progression – appearances of players
The following table shows the historical progression of appearances of players at the Olympic Games.

Head coaches
The following tables are pre-sorted by number of Olympic appearances (in descending order), date of the last Olympic appearance (in ascending order), date of the first Olympic appearance (in ascending order), name of the person (in ascending order), respectively. 

Six men have each made two Olympic appearances as head coaches of the United States men's national team. 

Four Americans have each made Olympic appearances as players and as head coaches of the United States men's national team.

Historical progression – appearances of head coaches
The following table shows the historical progression of appearances of head coaches at the Olympic Games.

Age records

Top 20 oldest players
The following table is pre-sorted by age of the last Olympic appearance (in descending order), date of the last Olympic appearance (in ascending order), Cap number or name of the player (in ascending order), respectively.

Top 20 oldest Olympic debutants
The following table is pre-sorted by age of the first Olympic appearance (in descending order), date of the first Olympic appearance (in ascending order), Cap number or name of the player (in ascending order), respectively.

Top 20 youngest players (Olympic debutants)
The following table is pre-sorted by age of the first Olympic appearance (in ascending order), date of the first Olympic appearance (in ascending order), Cap number or name of the player (in ascending order), respectively.

Physical records

Top 20 tallest players
The following table is pre-sorted by height of the player (in descending order), edition of the Olympics (in ascending order), name of the player (in ascending order), respectively.

*Qualified but withdrew.

Top 20 shortest players
The following table is pre-sorted by height of the player (in ascending order), edition of the Olympics (in ascending order), name of the player (in ascending order), respectively.

*Qualified but withdrew.

Top 20 heaviest players
The following table is pre-sorted by maximum weight of the player (in descending order), edition of the Olympics (in ascending order), name of the player (in ascending order), respectively.

Top 20 lightest players
The following table is pre-sorted by minimum weight of the player (in descending order), edition of the Olympics (in ascending order), name of the player (in ascending order), respectively.

*Qualified but withdrew.

Miscellaneous

Water polo families

Brothers
The three McIlroy brothers (Paul, Chick and Ned) were all members of the 1964 United States men's Olympic water polo team. 

The Kooistra brothers (Bill and Sam) played for the United States in water polo at the 1956 Olympics. Jeff Campbell competed alongside his elder brother, Peter, at the 1988 Olympics.

*Qualified but withdrew.

Tony van Dorp, a Dutch-American goalkeeper, competed in the 1964 and 1968 Summer Olympics for the United States. His younger brother, Fred, was a Dutch field player, and played against his brother at the 1964 and 1968 Olympics.

Father-son

Father-daughter

See also
 United States men's Olympic water polo team statistics
 United States men's Olympic water polo team statistics (matches played)
 United States men's Olympic water polo team statistics (scorers)
 United States men's Olympic water polo team statistics (goalkeepers)
 United States men's Olympic water polo team statistics (medalists)
 List of United States men's Olympic water polo team rosters
 United States men's Olympic water polo team results
 United States men's national water polo team

References

External links
 Official website

Men's Olympic statistics 1
Olympic men's statistics 1
United States Olympic men's statistics 1